Alqosh (Judeo-Aramaic: אלקוש, alternatively spelled Alkosh or Alqush) is a town in the Nineveh Plains of northern Iraq, a sub-district of the Tel Kaif District and is situated 45 km north of the city of Mosul.

The locals of Alqosh are Assyrians who mostly adhere to the Chaldean Catholic Church.

Etymology 
Several theories have been put forward for the origin of the town's name. The name Alqosh (Syriac: ܐܲܠܩܘܿܫ) may possibly trace back to the compound Assyrian-Akkadian name Eil-Kushtu, where Eil means “God”, and Kushtu means “righteousness” or “power”. Therefore, the village’s name would translate to "The God of Righteousness" or "The God of Power”. Some have put forward that the name originates from Assyrian Aramaic Eil Qushti, which means “The God of the Bow” or “Arched God”, possibly in reference to the village’s Assyrian history and the ancient Assyrian deity Ashur holding a bow. Another theory suggests that the name is Turkish Alkuş, meaning “scarlet/red bird”, but this theory is less likely because the name of the village is argued to have has existed since the ancient Assyrian period.

Christianity 

The importance of Alqosh for the Church of the East arose from its proximity to the Rabban Hormizd Monastery, named after its seventh-century founder Rabban Hormizd (Rabban means "monk"), who is venerated as a saint in the churches descended from the Church of the East.

The monastery, built on the mountain slope, was a centre of learning for the Church of the East not far from another centre but of the Syriac Orthodox Church. It was the burial place of the patriarchs of the Church of the East from the late fifteenth century and was their seat from the time of Shimun VI (1503–1538) until the end of the series of patriarchs known as the Eliya line. Isolated and cut off by snow from Alqosh in winter, it never became their permanent residence, and its line of patriarchs is commonly described as the Mosul line or as resident in Alqosh.

In the schism of 1552, the abbot of the monastery, Yohannan Sulaqa, was elected irregularly to the post of patriarch by several bishops who were dissatisfied with the restriction of patriarchal succession to members of a single family. By tradition, a patriarch could be ordained only by someone of archiepiscopal (metropolitan) rank, a rank to which only members of that one family were promoted. For that reason, Sulaqa travelled to Rome, where, presented as the new patriarch-elect, he entered communion with the Catholic Church, was ordained by the Pope, and recognized as patriarch. He and his successors (who eventually formally broke communion with Rome) took up residence further east. This schism gave rise to the Chaldean Catholic Church, in opposition to what historians call the traditionalist wing of the Church of the East, that which in 1976 officially adopted the name Assyrian Church of the East.

In the 17th and 18th centuries, the "legitimist" Alqosh patriarchal line from which Sulaqa broke away in 1552, drew closer to Rome, especially during the 58-year reign of Eliya XI/XII Denkha (1722−1778), who sent several letters to Rome, some with professions of faith in line with Catholic teaching, but no formal papal recognition followed. However, it was a member of the family from whom the "legitimate" traditionalist patriarchs were chosen, Yohannan Hormizd (1760–1838) who, having considered himself a Catholic since 1778, was chosen as patriarch of the Chaldean Catholic Church in 1830.

Association with the Prophet Nahum 
Austen Henry Layard, who visited the area in 1847, reported that by "a very ancient tradition" the village contains the tomb of the prophet Nahum, whose Old Testament book begins with: "An oracle concerning Nineveh. The book of the vision of Nahum of Elkosh." While Jerome located the birthplace of Nahum in Galilee, Layard considered the Alqosh tradition had some weight in spite of the lack of inscriptions or ancient remains. Iraqi Jews made pilgrimage to the site during Shavuot, and "He who has not made the pilgrimage to Nahum's tomb has not yet known real pleasure" was a common saying. When Jews were expelled from Iraq or voluntarily emigrated to Israel in 1948, the Jewish custodian entrusted the care of the building to a local Chaldean Catholic. A survey conducted in 2017 determined that the structure was in danger of collapse, and in the following year work began on stabilizing it.

Attacks
 1401 – the town was attacked and sacked by Timur (Tamerlane).
 1508 – Alqosh was attacked by Pasha of Baghdad Bar Yak (Murad Bey).
 1831 – the Soran Emirate attacked Alqosh, killing nearly 300 villagers.
 1828 – Mosa Pasha, the governor of Amadiya, approached Alqosh and set fire to the Rabban Hormizd Monastery.
 1832 – Muhammad Pasha of Rawanduz attacked Alqosh, killing over 600 of its inhabitants.
 1840 – Resoul Beck, Mira Koor's brother, repeated the attack.
 1843 – the Rabban Hormizd Monastery was attacked by the Kurds, and 1000 manuscripts may have been destroyed.
 2014 – The Islamic State came close to Alqosh, and almost all of the people fled; however, many men and youths did not leave Alqosh due to a desire to protect their town. ISIL failed to take the town after the intervention of the Peshmerga and Dwekh Nawsha.

Demographics

In March 2020, Shlama Foundation reported that the town had a population of 4,567: 1,015 families of Chaldean Catholic denomination.

According to the Unrepresented Nations & Peoples Organization, most of the inhabitants are Assyrians, with a smaller percentage of Yazidis. In 1913, the town of Alqosh, was according to Joseph Tfinkdji inhabited by 7,000 Chaldean Catholics. Many have emigrated since the 1970s. It is estimated that at least 40,000 "Alqushnaye" immigrants and their 2nd and 3rd generation descendants now live in the cities of Detroit, Michigan, the western suburb of Fairfield in Sydney, Australia and San Diego, California.

In February 2010, the attacks against Assyrian Chaldean Syriac people in northern Iraq forced 4,300 to flee from Mosul to the Nineveh Plains. A report by the United Nations stated that 504 Assyrians at once migrated to Alqosh. Many Assyrians from Mosul and Baghdad since the post-2003 Iraq war have fled to Alqosh for safety. The town's population in 2020 is estimated to be roughly 4,600.

Relations with KRG
In 2014 the mayor of Alqosh, Faiz Jahwareh, was detained and replaced by KDP member Lara Zara, only to be reinstated after protests by Alqosh residents. Jahwareh was again detained and replaced by the KRG in July 2017 on the basis of corruption charges that were dismissed by the Iraqi Federal Court.

Climate
Alqosh has a semi-arid climate (BSh) with extremely hot and dry summers, and cool wet winters.

Natives of Alqosh 

 Yohannan Hormizd (1760–1838), Patriarch of the Chaldean Catholic Church 1830–1838
 Joseph VI Audo (1790–1878), Patriarch of the Chaldean Catholic Church 1847–1878
 Toma Audo (1854–1918), Archbishop of Urmia
 Yousef VI Emmanuel II Thomas (1852–1947), Patriarch of the Chaldean Catholic Church 1900–1947
 Paul II Cheikho (1906–1989), Patriarch of the Chaldean Catholic Church 1958–1989
 Hirmis Aboona (1940–2009), historian
 Emil Shimoun Nona (1967– ), Archbishop of Mosul 2009–2015, Eparch of Chaldean Catholic Eparchy of Saint Thomas the Apostle of Sydney 2015–

See also 
Assyrians in Iraq
Assyrian homeland
Disputed territories of Northern Iraq
Proposals for Assyrian autonomy in Iraq
List of Assyrian settlements

References

Sources
 
 Addai Scher, Notice sur les manuscrits syriaques conservés dans la bibliothèque du couvent des Chaldéens de Notre-Dame-des-Semences, Journal Asiatique Sér. 10: 8, 9 (1906).  This may be found online at Gallica by searching for "Journal Asiatique".  An English translation of the first portion is at tertullian.org

External links

 alqosh.net
 alqush.com
 Alqosh: Vestiges Of Assyria (images of Alqosh)

Assyrian communities in Iraq
Populated places in Nineveh Governorate
15th-century BC establishments
Historic Jewish communities in Iraq
Nineveh Plains